The Independent Production Fund (IPF) is a Canadian private independent foundation that supports the production of Canadian dramatic digital media entertainment content and television series. It also provides professional development services and training to digital media producers and creators, in English and in French. See also Fonds indépendant de production entry (in French).

History 
In 1990 Maclean Hunter Limited, a former Canadian communications company, created the Maclean Hunter Television Fund  with a capital endowment of $29.2 M restricted in perpetuity, as a result of a Decision by the Canadian Radio-Television and Telecommunications Commission (CRTC).  The Fund was incorporated federally as a corporation without share capital and was granted charitable status.  Its mandate was to fund television drama series and undertake industry training with the interest generated by the endowment and return on investments.

The Fund mandate was extended to undertake the administration of other independent private funds supporting the Canadian film, television and digital media industry:  the Cogeco Program Development Fund  launched in 1993, the Bell Fund  (1997) and a series of other short-term industry Funds.

In 1994 Maclean Hunter was acquired by Rogers Communications, and the Fund was renamed the Independent Production Fund.   A five-member board of directors representing different sectors of the production industry governed the Fund's activities.

In 1999 the CRTC approved the IPF as a "Canadian Independent Production Fund"  eligible to receive contributions from Broadcast Distribution Undertakings (BDU's). In 2017, Cogeco Communications directed its annual Broadcast Distribution Undertaking (BDU) contributions to the IPF to establish the Cogeco TV Production Program.

From 1991 to 2010 the IPF invested over $47M in 251 Canadian television drama series. In 2010, the IPF's mandate was revised to focus funding on drama series created for new digital platforms. It allocates nearly $2M per year from the interest generated by the endowment and recoupment of its funding investments, to original digital drama series. From 2010–2017 the IPF invested $12.8M in 114 short form scripted digital series.

Executives 
CEO 1991–present:  Andra Sheffer 
Associate Director  (Quebec) 1991 – present:  Claire Dion 
Chair 1991–1995: Bernard Montigny
Chair 1996–2008: Peter Mortimer 
Chair 2009–2017:  Charles Ohayon
Chair 2018–present: Jon Taylor

Fund Recipients 
As of 2017, the IPF has supported 251 television projects, 422 professional development activities and 114 original online series which represents nearly $65M in funding.

Selection of funded original online series

References 

Digital media organizations
Arts organizations based in Canada
Internet in Canada